The Bell Educational Trust is an educational institution, that grew from the original EFL school, Bell International College, Cambridge, founded by Frank Bell in 1955. The Bell Educational Trust subsequently expanded outside Cambridge, with a number of partner schools, located in the UK and internationally. It is one of the most well-known schools for the teaching of English as a foreign language. Bell courses are accredited by the British Council.

History

Bell Language School, Cambridge 
Frank Bell founded the first Bell Language School in Cambridge, England, in 1955. He was concurrently Chairman of the Educational Interchange Council from 1951 to 1979, for which he was awarded the OBE in 1975. His mission was to promote international understanding by providing high quality and highly regulated English language training to students all over the world.

In 1972 he established an educational charity - the Bell Educational Trust. Its main aims remain: to provide language education, mainly in English, for adult students and young learners; to train teachers of English; and to offer language learning and teacher training experiences that will promote international understanding and intercultural exchange. The Trust has no shareholders, and money from fees is reinvested in developing and improving the services and facilities for students, and the worldwide services that are offered.

Bell staff and staff in Bell partner schools include language teachers, trainers, educational managers, consultants and materials writers, and Bell staff work closely with national and international organisations involved in language teaching worldwide.

Today, Bell is an international training organisation with three intensive training centres in the UK, a Young Learner operation, several wholly owned subsidiaries and more than 20 partners throughout Europe and in Asia . This makes Bell one of the largest British-owned providers of English language and teacher training courses.

In 2012 the Trust's business and charitable entities separated to form Bell Educational Services Ltd and the Bell Foundation respectively.

Bell Schools in England 

The three main schools in the UK are the original school in Cambridge, and the partner schools in London and St Albans (Hertfordshire). These schools cater for around 10,000 students annually, and provide intensive English courses ranging in length from a week to an academic year. Courses cover general / business English and English for specific and academic purposes, as well as a wide range of options. Bell St Albans provides full residential accommodation, Bell Cambridge specialises in academic courses, while Bell London specialises in business English courses for Professional students. In the past, students were also able to attend Bell Schools in Bath, Norwich (3 schools at one time - Willow Lane, Bowthorpe Hall and The Old House), Saffron Walden and Oxford.  Saffron Walden was initially named Saffron Walden International College (SWIC) and later changed to Bell College.

In addition, Bell runs residential courses for over 3000 young learner students (aged 8 – 17 years), mostly during the British summer, in a range of locations including St Albans, and summer camps at The Leys School in Cambridge, Cobham Hall School in Kent, Bloxham School in Oxfordshire and Wellington College in Berkshire.

In the UK Bell employs approximately 150 staff all year round with a further 400/500 being appointed on seasonal or short-term contracts.  Although for many years a series of trades unions were recognised by management for the purposes of negotiating staff salaries, conditions etc., this right was withdrawn recently when union membership fell below 50%. Subsequently, although a membership drive among permanent staff restored an adequate level for recognition, the management withheld recognition on the grounds that temporary staff had not been included, although previously denying union rights to represent this category of staff.

Bell Schools Worldwide 

Bell subsidiaries’ schools are located in Budapest (Hungary) and Geneva (Switzerland).

In addition to these wholly owned schools, Bell has an international network of Partner Schools. These centres are located in: Czech Republic, Bulgaria, China, Jordan, Poland, Romania, Saudi Arabia, Italy, Spain, Thailand, Ukraine, Vietnam.

Bell centres outside the UK provide part-time training in a range of languages for clients from as young as two through to young adults and executives. Courses in English can be targeted to lead into, or follow up from, intensive courses in the UK.

Other Languages 

Bell centres outside the UK offer courses in their own local languages to diplomatic and expatriate clients, plus a range of other languages that correspond to local needs. On an international scale Bell offers not only English, but also French, Czech, Italian, Spanish, Polish, German and Japanese.

Teacher Training 

Teacher training is another aspect of Bell ’s offering, and courses are run in the UK as well as in most centres abroad. Bell regularly provides teacher trainers to run workshops or tailored courses in other countries. Many Bell staff are regular contributors to international teacher training journals and conferences. Bell Teacher development courses are offered during January, July and August. These take place at Bell Teacher Campus based at Homerton College, part of the University of Cambridge.

Management, Consultancy and Project Services 

For many years Bell has provided a variety of management, consultancy and project services to international organisations and governments. These range from developing language training policy and institutions to management of language centres. Bell is also involved in other short-term language training, teacher education work outside the UK.

Accreditation 

Bell International is accredited by the British Council. This guarantee of quality recognises professional standards following rigorous and regular inspections.

References

Educational organisations based in the United Kingdom